Poppi is a comune (municipality) in the Province of Arezzo in the Italian region Tuscany, located about  east of Florence and about  northwest of Arezzo.

Poppi borders the following municipalities: Bibbiena, Castel Focognano, Castel San Niccolò, Chiusi della Verna, Ortignano Raggiolo, Pratovecchio Stia.

Main sights

Poppi Castle, or the Castello dei Conti Guidi, the main building in the Casentino, known from 1191, was owned by the Counts Guidi.  It has additions by Arnolfo di Cambio.  It has a  courtyard, an external staircase, its chapel with frescos and its library containing rare manuscripts and incunabula.
Hermitage of Camaldoli, the ancestral seat of the Camaldolese monastic order.
Madonna del Morbo Sanctuary in the centre of the town, containing a painting of the Virgin attributed to Filippino Lippi.
The annual festival commences in the upper town on 29 June, when a large procession bears the image of the Virgin from the Church of Madonna del Morbo to the Church of Saints Marco and Lorenzo, where it remains for the duration of the week.
The Museo e Arboreto Carlo Siemoni is a historic ducal villa and arboretum.
 Palazzo Crudeli, birthplace of Tommaso Crudeli condemned by the Catholic Church as heretic. He belonged to the first Freemason Lodge of Italy established by the English colony in Florence, 1732.   He died in the same Palazzo after torture and imprisonment.
 Museum Affaire Crudeli and Human Rights.

Sister cities
 Palafolls, Spain, since 1990
 Ax-les-Thermes, France, since 2008

References

External links

 

Cities and towns in Tuscany
Castles in Italy